Brad Hunt may refer to:

Brad Hunt (actor), American actor
Brad Hunt (ice hockey) (born 1988), Canadian ice hockey player
Brad Hunt, contestant on The Amazing Race 14